Linda Ferrando (born 12 January 1966) is a former Italian international tennis player. 

She competed in the Fed Cup a number of times, from 1991 to 1993.

WTA career finals

Doubles: 3 (1 title, 2 runner-ups)

ITF Circuit finals

Singles: 5 (3–2)

Doubles: 4 (2–2)

References

External links
 
 

1966 births
Living people 
Italian female tennis players
20th-century Italian women